Himawari is the second studio album by the group Swayzak, released on 11 July 2000.

Track listing 
"Illegal" - 4:14
"Kensai Rising" - 4:23
"State of Grace" - 4:54
"Leisure Centre" - 5:30
"Mysterons" - 4:32
"Doobie" - 7:29
"Caught In This Affair" - 5:13
"Japan Air" - 7:57
"Pineapple Spongecake" - 5:08
"The Frozen Loch" - 5:41
"Floyd" - 7:13
"Betek" - 9:12

Citations and references

External links
 Official website discography

2000 albums
Swayzak albums